Sainte-Praxède is a parish municipality located in Les Appalaches Regional County Municipality in the Chaudière-Appalaches region of Quebec, Canada. Its population was 363 as of the Canada 2011 Census. It was named after Catholic saint Praxedes.

Demographics 

References

Commission de toponymie du Québec
Ministère des Affaires municipales, des Régions et de l'Occupation du territoire

Incorporated places in Chaudière-Appalaches
Parish municipalities in Quebec